Abdul Malek is a Bangladesh Awami League politician and the former member of parliament of Mymensingh-4.  He was an organizer of the Liberation War of Bangladesh.

Career 
Abdul Malek was elected to parliament from Mymensingh-4 as a Bangladesh Awami League candidate in 1973.  He was an organizer of the Liberation War of Bangladesh.

References 

Living people
Year of birth missing (living people)
People from Mymensingh District
Awami League politicians
1st Jatiya Sangsad members